Tuālāuta County is a county in the Western District in American Samoa. It is the largest and also the most populated county in American Samoa. The county is represented by two seats in the Senate and two seats in House of Representatives in the American Samoa Legislature. 'Ili'ili is the principal place in Tualauta County, a county which consists of 'Ili'ili, Pava'ia'i, Mapusaga, Faleniu, Mesepa, Malae'imi, Tafuna, and Vaitogi.

As of 2015, the county has a population of 19,519 residents. Tualauta County has the highest number of registered voters in American Samoa: 2,033 female voters and 1,660 male voters (3,693 total voters). However, in terms of votes cast in the 2016 election, more votes were cast in Maoputasi County. Tualauta County also has the highest number of voters between the ages of 18–35 with 2,105.

Tualauta County, which is the most populated county in American Samoa, had the highest number of housing units according to the 2010 U.S. Census with 4,080 units, followed by 1,999 housing units for Maoputasi County. Tualauta County has experienced a large population increase and, as of the 2010 U.S. Census, the county had over double the number of residents as Maoputasi County (home to the territorial capital of Pago Pago).

At 9.91 sq. mi., it is the largest county in American Samoa.

Tuālāuta contains most of Tutuila Island's flatland, including the Tafuna Plain.

Demographics

Tuālāuta County was first recorded beginning with the 1912 special census. Regular decennial censuses were taken beginning in 1920.

Villages
Faleniu
'Ili'ili
Mapusaga Fou
Pava'ia'i
Vaitogi
Tāfuna
Ottoville
Fatuoaiga
Malaeimi

Landmarks

American Samoa Community College, in Mapusaga
Cathedral of the Holy Family, in Tāfuna
Fogāma'a Crater National Natural Landmark, in Vaitogi
'Ili'ili Golf Course, in 'Ili'ili
Lions Park, in Tāfuna
Pago Pago International Airport, in Tāfuna
Tradewinds Hotel, at Ottoville
Turtle and Shark site, in Vaitogi
 Tia Seu Lupe historical site, at Fatuoaiga
 Tony Solaita Baseball Field, in Tāfuna
 Veterans Memorial Stadium, in Tāfuna

References 

 

Populated places in American Samoa